SITS:Vision, also known just as SITS, is a database application used for course and student management in further and higher education institutions, developed and maintained by the Tribal Group. It is currently used by roughly 70% of the UK higher education sector as well as international institutions such as the University of Sydney and the University of Otago.

History
SITS has been in existence since 1991 and was first developed by a former Registrar and IT Director of a UK university. The company, Strategic Information Technology Services, started in a residential property in Beverley, East Yorkshire before moving to commercial property in Middleton-on-the-Wolds. The business moved to Hessle, East Yorkshire, in 1997 and into the current premises in Hesslewood in 2000.
SITS was acquired by Tribal Group PLC [TRB.L] in 2004.

E:Vision
E:Vision (sometimes styled as eVision or e:Vision), is a web-based interface designed to interact with the SITS client.

It was created with the intention of allowing users to design web-based interfaces for student and/or staff interaction. This has the advantage of allowing the user to circumvent the SITS client which some customers find cumbersome.

E:Vision interfaces are created using the traditional SITS client, but does not come as a standard component when purchasing SITS. The two basic type of interfaces that can be created are 'tasks' and 'vistas' - the former allowing workflows to be created wherein a user might complete a process or operation, the latter offers an area in which data can be viewed and edited.

Institutions that use SITS:Vision

In the United Kingdom 
 Arts University Bournemouth	
 Adam Smith College
 Anglia Ruskin University
 Aston University
 Bath Spa University
 Birkbeck College
 Birmingham City University
 Bournemouth University
 University of Brighton
 Brunel University
 Cardiff University
 City, University of London
 Courtauld Institute of Art
 Cranfield University
 University of Cumbria
 Dundee & Angus College
 Falmouth University
 Guildhall School of Music and Drama
 Keele University
 King's College London
 Kingston University
 Liverpool Hope University
 Liverpool Institute for Performing Arts
 London Metropolitan University
 London School of Economics and Political Science
 London School of Hygiene and Tropical Medicine
 Northumbria University
 Norwich University of the Arts
 Queen Mary University of London
 Regent's University London
 Robert Gordon University
 Royal Veterinary College
 Swansea University
 Sheffield Hallam University
 Teesside University
 UK College of Business and Computing
 University College of Estate Management
 University of the Arts London
 University of Abertay
 University of Bath
 University of Bedfordshire
 University of Bolton
 University of Bristol
 University of Bradford
 University of Chester
 University of Chichester
 University College London
 University for the Creative Arts
 University of Dundee
 University of East Anglia
 University of East London
 University of Exeter
 University of Gloucestershire
 University of Huddersfield
 University of Hull
 University of Kent
 University of London
 University of Leicester
 University of Oxford
 University of Portsmouth
 University of Reading
 University of Sheffield
 University of St Andrews
 University of Stirling
 University of Sunderland
 University of Surrey
 University of Sussex
 University of the Highlands and Islands
 University of Warwick
 University of Westminster
 University of the West of England
 University of Winchester
 University of Wolverhampton
 University of Worcester
 University of York
 York St. John University

Outside the United Kingdom 
 Central European University, Austria
 Trinity College Dublin, Ireland
 University of Malta, Malta
 Massey University, New Zealand
 University of Otago, New Zealand
 University of Waikato, New Zealand
 University of Sydney, Australia
 RMIT University, Australia
 Universiti Teknologi PETRONAS, Malaysia
 University of Malaya, Malaysia
 University of Limerick, Ireland
 University of British Columbia, Canada
 Xi'an Jiaotong-Liverpool University, China
 Osloskolen, Norway

References

Educational software